XHPCA-FM is a radio station in Pachuca, Hidalgo, Mexico, broadcasting on 106.1 FM. It is owned by Grupo Siete Comunicación and known as Crystal with a Regional Mexican format.

History
XHPCA received its concession on October 25, 1991. It was owned by Carlos Rafael González Aragón Ortiz and, like his other stations, sold to Grupo Siete. It originally broadcast that company's Crystal format, switching to Exa FM in 2004 when Grupo Siete entered into a deal with MVS Radio. That deal ended in January 2008, and the station relaunched as "Neurótica FM" in February 2008, a name already used by the company at its XHTOM-FM in Toluca.

The station returned to a franchised pop format in 2009 when the station switched to Los 40 Principales. This ended after four years with the use of different names for the same pop format, including +Radio (Más Radio) from 2013 to 2015 and Neurótik from 2015 to 2021.

On May 31, 2021, XHPCA became Grupo Siete's third Radio Disney station after XHFO-FM revived the format in 2020 and XHTOM-FM in Toluca, the other former Neurótik station, converted to Radio Disney earlier in the year.

XHPCA and XHMY-FM 95.7 exchanged formats on August 29, 2022, with the Crystal brand returning to XHPCA.

References

Radio stations in Hidalgo (state)
Radio stations established in 1991
1991 establishments in Mexico